The International Handball Federation (IHF) is the administrative and controlling body for handball and beach handball. IHF is responsible for the organisation of handball's major international tournaments, notably the IHF World Men's Handball Championship, which commenced in 1938, and the IHF World Women's Handball Championship, which commenced in 1957.

IHF was founded in 1946 to oversee international competitions. Headquartered in Basel, its membership now comprises 209 national federations. Each member country must each also be a member of one of the six regional confederations: Africa, Asia, Europe, North America and Caribbean, Oceania, and South and Central America. Dr. Hassan Moustafa from Egypt has been President of the IHF since 26 November 2000.

History

The IHF was founded on 11 July 1946, in Copenhagen (Denmark) by representatives of eight national federations. The founding members were Denmark, Finland, France, Norway, Netherlands, Poland, Sweden, and Switzerland. The first president of IHF was Gösta Björk from Sweden. Björk was replaced in 1950 by Hans Baumann from Switzerland.
In 1954, the first IHF Men's World Championship, was conducted under the aegis of the IHF, in Sweden with the participation of six national teams. In 1957, the first IHF World Women's Handball Championship was held in SFR Yugoslavia with the participation of nine national teams. Handball was included in the Olympic Games for the first time under the auspices of IHF in Munich 1972 (men's tournament) and Montreal 1976 (women's tournament).

Structure

Laws and governance
IHF is headquartered in Basel, and is a federation established under the Law of Switzerland.
IHF's supreme body is the IHF Congress, an assembly made up of representatives from each affiliated member association. Each national handball association has one vote, regardless of its size or handballing strength. The Congress assembles in ordinary session once in two years (odd years) after the IHF World Men's Handball Championship. The congress makes decisions relating to IHF's governing statutes and their method of implementation and application. Only the Congress can pass changes to IHF's statutes. The congress approves the annual report, and decides on the acceptance of new national associations and holds elections. Congress elects the President of IHF, its General Secretary, and the other members of the IHF Council.
IHF's Council, chaired by the President, is the main decision-making body of the organisation in the intervals of Congress. The Council is composed of 18 people: the President, 5 Vice Presidents, and 12 members. The Council is the body that decides which country will host the World Championship.
The President and General Secretary are the main officeholders of IHF, and are in charge of its daily administration, carried out by the General Secretariat. Dr. Hassan Moustafa is the current president, appointed in the year 2000 at the 28th Ordinary IHF Congress.

Six confederations and 209 national associations
The IHF is composed of six continental federations which organize continental championships held every other second year: African Handball Confederation, Asian Handball Federation, European Handball Federation, North America and the Caribbean Handball Confederation, Oceania Continent Handball Federation, and South and Central America Handball Confederation. In addition to continental competitions between national teams, the federations arrange international tournaments between club teams.

Until 2017, there were five continental confederations. On 14 January 2018, the IHF Council divided the Pan-American Confederation into the North America and the Caribbean Handball Confederation and the South and Central America Handball Confederation. The authority to divide a continental confederation was assigned to the IHF Congress, but the 36th IHF Congress in 2017 authorized the IHF Council to divide the Pan-American Team Handball Federation.

IHF presidents

† Hans Baumann died in office on 9 February 1971 due to illness.

IHF Executive committee
The following is the IHF Executive Committee for the term 2021 — 2025.

IHF Council

The IHF Council is the IHF's main decision-making body between meetings of the IHF Congress. It is currently serving a 2021—2025 term.

IHF commissions

 Italics means Acting Chairperson

IHF tournaments
Handball
 IHF World Men's Handball Championship
 IHF World Women's Handball Championship
 IHF Men's Junior World Championship
 IHF Women's Junior World Championship
 IHF Men's Youth World Championship
 IHF Women's Youth World Championship
 IHF Emerging Nations Championship
 IHF Inter-Continental Trophy
 IHF Confederations Cup (proposed)

Beach handball
 IHF Beach Handball World Championship
 IHF Youth Beach Handball World Championship
 IHF Beach Handball Global Tour

 Wheelchair handball
 IHF Wheelchair Handball World Championship

Club handball
 IHF Super Globe
 IHF Women's Super Globe

Multi-sport events
 Handball at the Summer Olympics
 Handball at the Youth Olympic Games (Defunct)
 Beach handball at the World Games
 Beach handball at the World Beach Games

 Beach handball at the Youth Olympic Games

Title holders

International title holders

Continental title holders

 * = Record titles

Member federations
Category A

 Algeria
 Argentina
 Austria
 Belarus
 Bahrain
 China
 Croatia
 Czech Republic
 Denmark
 Spain
 France
 Germany
 Hungary
 I. R. Iran
 Iceland
 Italy
 Japan
 South Korea
 Saudi Arabia
 Kuwait
 Montenegro
 Netherlands
 Norway
 Oman
 Poland
 Qatar
 Romania
 Russian Federation
 Slovenia
 Serbia
 Switzerland
 Slovakia
 Sweden
 United Arab Emirates

Category B

 Angola
 Belgium
 Bosnia and Herzegovina
 Brazil
 Egypt
 Finland
 Greece
 Hong Kong, China
 Israel
 Jordan
 Kazakhstan
 Libya
 Luxembourg
 Morocco
 North Macedonia
 Portugal
 Singapore
 Tunisia
 Turkey
 Ukraine

Category C

  Afghanistan
 Albania
 Andorra
 Antigua and Barbuda
 Armenia
 American Samoa
 Australia
 Azerbaijan
 Bahamas
 Bangladesh
 Barbados
 Burundi
 Benin
 Bhutan ✝
 Belize ✝
 Bolivia
 Botswana
 Brunei
 Bulgaria
 Burkina Faso
 Central African Republic
 Cambodia ✝
 Canada
 Cayman Islands ✝
 Congo
 Chad
 Chile
 Ivory Coast
 Cameroon
 DR Congo
 Cook Islands
 Colombia
 Comoros
 Cape Verde
 Costa Rica
 Cuba
 Cyprus
 Djibouti
 Dominica
 Dominican Republic
 Ecuador
 El Salvador
 Estonia
 Ethiopia
 Faroe Islands
 Fiji
 Federated States of Micronesia
 Gabon
 Gambia
 Great Britain
 Guinea-Bissau
 Georgia
 Equatorial Guinea ✝
 Ghana
 Greenland
 Grenada ✝
 Guatemala
 Guinea
 Guam
 Guyana ✝
 Haiti
 Honduras
 Indonesia
 India
 Ireland
 Iraq
 British Virgin Islands ✝
 Jamaica
 Kenya
 Kyrgyzstan
 Kiribati
 Kosovo
 Laos ✝
 Latvia
 Lebanon
 Liberia
 Saint Lucia
 Lesotho
 Liechtenstein
 Lithuania
 Macau,China
 Madagascar
 Malaysia
 Malawi
 Moldova
 Maldives
 Mexico
 Mongolia
 Marshall Islands
 Mali
 Malta
 Monaco
 Mozambique
 Mauritius
  Mauritania
 Namibia ✝
 Nicaragua
 Nepal
 Nigeria
 Niger
 Nauru ✝
 New Zealand
 Pakistan
 Panama
 Paraguay
 Peru
 Philippines
 Palestine
 Palau ✝
 Papua New Guinea
 North Korea
 Puerto Rico
 South Africa
 Rwanda
 Samoa
 Senegal
 Seychelles
 Saint Kitts and Nevis
 Sierra Leone
 Solomon Islands
 Somalia
 Sri Lanka
 South Sudan
 São Tomé and Príncipe
 Sudan
 Swaziland
 Syria
 Tanzania
 Tonga
 Thailand
 Tajikistan
 Turkmenistan
 Timor Leste
 Togo
 Chinese Taipei
 Trinidad and Tobago
 Tuvalu ✝
 Uganda
 Uruguay
 United States of America
 Uzbekistan
 Vanuatu
 Venezuela
 Vietnam
 Yemen
 Zambia
 Zimbabwe

 ✝ means non-active member

Associated members

 England
 French Polynesia
 Northern Mariana Islands
 Scotland

Regional members

 French Guiana
 Guadeloupe
  Martinique
  New Caledonia

IHF Awards
The IHF issues awards to organisations and individuals in recognition of their particular contribution to developing the sport of handball and the IHF.

These awards are:
 Hans Baumann Trophy (defunct after 2015, renamed as IHF President's Development Award)
 IHF Badge of Merit
 IHF Certificate of Merit
 IHF Cup of Honour and certificate
 IHF Hall of Fame
 IHF Honorary President and Honorary Members
 IHF Olympic Order
 IHF Plaque of Merit
 IHF President's Development Award
 IHF Referee's Badge of Honour
 IHF Referee's Diploma of Honour
 IHF Ring of Honour
 IHF World Coach of the Year
 IHF World Player of the Year

IHF partners

References

External links

 

International sports organizations
IOC-recognised international federations
International sports bodies based in Switzerland
Organisations based in Basel
Sports organizations established in 1946
1946 establishments in Denmark